Zeynal or Zeinal may refer to:
 Zeynal, Ilam
 Zeynal, Kurdistan